Julius Kimtai Rotich (4 April 1974) is a male long-distance runner from Kenya.

He is a two-time winner of the AAA 10 kilometres championships and was runner-up to Paul Tergat at the 2002 Great North Run.

Achievements

External links

References

Living people
Kenyan male long-distance runners
1974 births
Athletes (track and field) at the 1998 Commonwealth Games
Commonwealth Games competitors for Kenya